The Wisbech Canal was a broad canal from Wisbech, Isle of Ely in the Fenland area of Cambridgeshire, England. It ran from the River Nene at Wisbech to the Well Creek at Outwell now in Norfolk, which gave access to the River Great Ouse. It was abandoned in 1926 and filled in during the 1970s.

History
The canal was planned as a means to improve the status of Wisbech as a trading centre. Following correspondence between the Hon and Revd Charles Lindsay, who later became chairman of the company, and Lord Hardwicke, on the potential benefits of the scheme, an engineer called John Watte was asked to undertake a survey and make a plan including the estimated costs of opening up the old river to create the Wisbech and Well Navigation. These were to be presented at a public meeting on 30 October 1792, at the Rose and Crown Inn, Wisbech however the meeting was swamped by speculators and traders from places as far away as Derby, Leicester, Uppingham, Huntingdon and Bedford. Some difficulty was experienced in maintaining control, but the local people succeeded in doing so, although the initial committee consisted of equal numbers of "strangers and people at home".

The committee called a meeting  at the Rose and Crown Inn, in Wisbech, on Friday 19th July, 1793, to report back and progress the scheme.

A petition was presented to Parliament on behalf of the burgesses of Wisbech in early 1794, and the canal was authorised by an Act of Parliament (Wisbech Canal Act 1794, 34 George III. Cap. 92) which was granted on 9 May 1794.

A notice published in the press states that the locks at either end would be of a similar length, this appears not to have been the case when they were constructed.

This Act formed The Wisbech Canal Company, which had powers to raise £14,000, with an option to raise an additional £6,000 if required. This was to be used to construct the canal which ran from a junction with the River Nene at Wisbech, to a junction with the Well Creek and the Old River Nene at Outwell. The Well Creek connects to the Great Ouse. In addition, the company had powers to maintain and improve the river from Outwell Church to Salter's Lode Sluice on the Old River Nene. All traffic passing between the canal and the Nene River was required to pay a toll, which was to be used to maintain the Well Creek.

A call for a further £10 per share was made in May 1795  and again in September 1795.

Because of the low level of the Fens landscape, the canal was constructed on embankments for most of its 5.25 mile (8.4 km) length, and was opened in 1797. Flood locks were constructed at both ends of the canal. The canal did not have its own water supply, but was refilled when the water level in the Nene at Wisbech was high enough. This was normally only at spring tides, and so the water level often ran low in the period before the next spring tide was due.

In 1834 a storm caused a high tide which damaged the new sluice and the swollen waters overflowed the banks of the canal causing considerable flooding between Wisbech and Outwell.

In 1883, the Wisbech and Upwell Tramway opened, running from Wisbech to Outwell and following a route along the course of the canal. It was extended to Upwell in 1884. Initially, there was some benefit to the canal, as coal was transported by the railway to Outwell, and loaded into boats by chutes, however, the railways steadily took the trade. 

The canal became a popular place to skate, the nearby pubs often arranging matches and prizes. In 1890 Pogson, the Wisbech sluice keeper, was accused of having deliberately broken up the ice by letting in water, he was chased to the keeper's cottage and a crowd assembled and smashed the windows.

The Wisbech Canal Bill, which provided for the closing and sale of the canal and for the dissolution  of the company was sent for first reading in the House of Commons in 1903.

The bill was reported as being withdrawn in March.

A poaching case prosecution in 1907 revealed that the Sheffield Anglers Association had held the fishing rights for 15 years. In 1910 the Sheffield Amalgamated Angling Society acquired the fishing rights.

In 1914, the tolls collected only amounted to £56. All traffic ceased in 1922, and the canal was formally abandoned on 14 June 1926, when a warrant for its closure was obtained from the Minister of Transport.

There were frequent drownings in the canal and nearby River Nene. John Gordon was just one of many people to rescue a child from a watery grave.

The canal remained in a derelict state until the early 1960s, when the Wisbech end was filled in to allow the A1101 Churchill Road link to be built without destroying the historic town centre. Much of the rest of the canal was used as a landfill site, and consequently any development within 270 yd (250m) of the former line of the canal requires special consent from Cambridgeshire County Council's Waste Management Services department.

See also

Canals of Great Britain
History of the British canal system

Points of interest

Bibliography

References

Canals in England
Canals opened in 1797
Canals in Cambridgeshire
Canals in Norfolk
Wisbech